HMS L27 was a L-class submarine built for the Royal Navy during World War I. The boat was not completed before the end of the war and was one of three L-class boats to serve during World War II. She served as training boat before being broken up in 1944.

Design and description
L9 and its successors were enlarged to accommodate 21-inch (53.3 cm) torpedoes and more fuel. They displaced  on the surface and  submerged. The L-class submarines had a crew of 35 officers and ratings.

For surface running, the boats were powered by two 12-cylinder Vickers  diesel engines, each driving one propeller shaft. When submerged each propeller was driven by a  electric motor. They could reach  on the surface and  underwater.

The boats were armed with four  torpedo tubes in the bow and two  tubes in broadside mounts. They carried four reload torpedoes for the 21-inch tubes for a grand total of ten torpedoes of all sizes. They were also armed with a  deck gun.

Construction and career
HMS L27 was built by Vickers at their Barrow-in-Furness shipyard, launched on 14 June 1919. She was then towed and completed at HM Dockyard, Sheerness and commissioned on an unknown date.

At the onset of the Second World War, L27 was a member of the 6th Submarine Flotilla. From 26–29 August 1939, the flotilla deployed to its war bases at Dundee and Blyth. From 20 September 1939 to 15 January 1940, the 6th Submarine Flotilla was deployed off Skagerrak, Jutland and Horns Reef. On 15 October 1940 L27 attacked a German convoy unsuccessfully in the English Channel.

L27 was among the submarines assigned to the patrol. On 15 October 1941, the submarine unsuccessfully attacked a merchant vessel off Cherbourg.

L27 was converted into a training boat at Portsmouth before being broken up in Canada in 1944.

Notes

Citations

References
 
 
 
 
 

 

British L-class submarines
Ships built in Barrow-in-Furness
1919 ships
World War I submarines of the United Kingdom
Royal Navy ship names